Dragons' Den is an Irish television series, presented by Richard Curran, based on the worldwide series Dragons' Den. It first aired in February 2009 and ran for eight series, until 2017.

History

The first episode was broadcast on 19 February 2009.

The third season aired on RTÉ One with Norah Casey as the new Dragon. Toward the end of the season, episodes showed the Dragons on tour visiting their past investments.

For the fourth season, Seán O'Sullivan, co-founder of Kinsale-based Avego Ltd, replaced Seán Gallagher. A live, interactive Sixth Dragon Game was developed to be played whilst watching the show, in which viewers are able to decide if they're "in" or "out" as the pitches unfold. The Sixth Dragon Game is the first live interactive game for an Irish TV show.

The eighth series of Dragons Den included three female Dragons for the first time. Chanelle McCoy, wife of Tony McCoy, was new to the Den that year, replacing Seán O'Sullivan.

Dragons
The dragons throughout the series' run were:.

Former Dragon Seán Gallagher was a candidate in the 2011 presidential election, coming in second to Michael D. Higgins. Three current or former Dragons, Peter Casey, Seán Gallagher and Gavin Duffy, were candidates in the 2018 presidential election, coming in second, third and sixth (last), respectively.

References 

2009 Irish television series debuts
2017 Irish television series endings
RTÉ original programming
Television series by Screentime
Irish television series based on non-Irish television series